Leif Alpsjö (born 1943, Uppsala) is a Swedish folk musician.  In 1974 he was awarded the status of riksspelman on the fiddle, and that same year he also took up the nyckelharpa (Swedish key-fiddle).  He is self-taught, and has been a full-time fiddler since 1975.

References

Further reading
  Samfundet för visforskning, Svenskt visarkiv. Sumlen.  Samfundet för visforskning, 1983

External links
Leif Alpsjö's website

Riksspelmän
Swedish fiddlers
Male violinists
1943 births
Nyckelharpa players
Living people
20th-century Swedish musicians
20th-century violinists
21st-century Swedish musicians
21st-century violinists
Musicians from Uppsala
20th-century Swedish male musicians
21st-century Swedish male musicians